Wertheim (East Franconian: Wärde) is a town in southwestern Germany, in the state of Baden-Württemberg with a population of around 23,400. It is located on the confluence of the rivers Tauber and Main. Wertheim is best known for its landmark castle and medieval town centre.

Geography
Wertheim is the most northerly town in the state of Baden-Württemberg. It is situated at the confluence of the rivers Tauber and Main, on the Main's left bank. It borders on the Odenwald hills and the Spessart range to the north across the river Main. Wertheim is located in the Main-Tauber district.

Neighboring communities
The following towns and communities border on Wertheim, listed clockwise starting in the east:
Holzkirchen, Helmstadt and Neubrunn (all district Würzburg, Bavaria), Werbach and Külsheim (both Main-Tauber district), Neunkirchen (district Miltenberg, Bavaria), Freudenberg (Main-Tauber district), Stadtprozelten and Faulbach (both Miltenberg district) and Hasloch, Kreuzwertheim and Triefenstein (all Main-Spessart district, Bavaria).

History

 was founded between the 7th and 8th century. However, the first settlement was a town called  on the right bank of the river Main. From the early 12th century onwards, a branch of the noble family of the Reginbodons called themselves after the town. After the family of the  had built a castle on the left bank of the river Main, a settlement developed at the foot of this dominating structure that was called . It was mentioned for the first time in 779.

Count  of  reigned from the year 1355 to 1373. In 1363 Emperor Charles IV granted him by degree the right to mint coins. He married , the oldest daughter of Ludwig of Stolberg.

The town developed into the center of the County of Wertheim. In 1630, the house split into two lines: the older Protestant line  and the Catholic line . The county existed until 1806 when it was divided as a consequence of the German mediatization. The area left of the Main river was given to the Grand Duchy of Baden, while the territories right of the Main were given to the Kingdom of Bavaria.

Established in 1406, the cemetery of the former Jewish community is one of the oldest in Germany.

For many years  was home to Peden Barracks, a US Army installation. The US Army left Peden Barracks in the early 1990s as part of the post Cold War reorganization of US armed forces in Germany.

In 1938,  was merged with  into the newly created district .

Demographics

¹ Census result

Arts and culture

Museums
  (glass museum)

Events

Buildings
 (castle) is the landmark of the town. Wertheim has a medieval town center with half-timbered houses and small streets. The Gothic  was built in 1383 (today it is a Protestant parish church). Two clocks can be seen on the clock tower, one with an hour hand only, for the residents of the castle. The , a Gothic chapel, was constructed after 1469. The  ("Angels' well") from 1574 was built of the red sandstone typical of this area and derives its name from two little angels holding Wertheim's coat of arms.

The outlying Stadtteil of Urphar features a medieval fortified church, .

The late-Romanesque and early-Gothic basilica was consecrated in 1222.

Economy 
The glass manufacturing tradition in Wertheim and its surroundings dates back several centuries.

Governance

Mayors
 1810–1827: Johann Christoph Schlundt
 1827–1829: Christoph Michael Platz
 1829–1832: Johann Georg Weimar
 1832–1839: Johann Friedrich Bach
 1839–1840: Christoph Wilhelm Müller
 1840–1845: Johann Jakob von Runkel
 1845–1852: Ludwig Haas
 1852–1860: Johann Jakob von Runkel
 1860–1866: Ludwig Haas
 1866–1871: Philipp Frank
 1871–1880: Lorenz Meyer
 1880–1890: Philipp Amthauer
 1890–1895: Philipp Mayer
 1895–1905: Michael Müller
 1905–1933: Hans Bardon
 1933–1938: Friedrich Bender
 1938–1943: Hans Mensler
 1944–1945: Hermann Dürr
 1945: Carl Roth
 1945–1946: Michael Beck
 1946: Otto Hoog
 1946–1961: Carl Roth
 1961–1981: Karl Josef Scheuermann
 1981–2003: Stefan Gläser
 2003–2019: Stefan Mikulicz
 2019–present: Markus Herrera Torrez

Coat of arms
The coat of arms of Wertheim, shows a parted shield the upper part in gold with a black eagle and below in blue three silver roses. The city flag is yellow-blue. The coat of arms is nearly unchanged in use since 1556. It is the coat of arms of the Counts of Wertheim. The meaning of the symbols is unknown.

Twin towns – sister cities

Wertheim is twinned with:
 Salon-de-Provence, France (1964)
 Godmanchester, England, United Kingdom (1981)
 Huntingdon, England, United Kingdom (1981)
 Szentendre, Hungary (1989)
 Csobánka, Hungary (1992)
 Gubbio, Italy (2006)

Notable people

Philipp Buchner (1614–1669), composer
Johann Philipp Förtsch (1652–1732), composer, statesman and doctor
Matthew Klein (1911–1988), philosopher and ethicist, was born in Bettingen
Gerd Langguth (1946–2013), political scientist
Thomas Reis (born 1973), former professional football player, Bochum and Eintracht Frankfurt
Henri-Joseph Rigel (1741–1799), composer
Shimon Schwarzschild (born 1925), environmentalist, grew up in Wertheim until the age of 10
Normann Stadler (born 1973), triathlete, winner of Ironman Hawaii 2004, 2006

References

External links

  
 Tourist site 

Franconian Circle
Historic Jewish communities in Europe
Main-Tauber-Kreis
Baden
Populated places on the Main basin
Populated riverside places in Germany